Victoria Symphony Splash is an annual event held in Victoria, British Columbia on the Sunday before BC Day. The event is produced by the Victoria Symphony and consists of the Victoria Symphony playing, live on a barge, in the middle of Victoria's Inner Harbour.  Also included in the event is a very large fireworks display, as well as live cannon fire, during the 1812 Overture.  The concert is led by Victoria Symphony Music Director Tania Miller. The 2016 event on July 31 will be the 27th Victoria Symphony Splash.

The free event leads to about 40,000 spectators gathered around the Victoria waterfront, as well as on the grounds of the British Columbia Parliament Buildings and The Empress Hotel. It is one of the largest annual symphony events in North America.  Hundreds of people also gather in boats and kayaks to watch the concert. Each year, a young soloist is a featured performer with the orchestra.

References

External links
Victoria Symphony
Victoria Symphony Splash

Culture of Victoria, British Columbia
Music festivals in British Columbia
Tourist attractions in Victoria, British Columbia
Classical music festivals in Canada